Kate Westbrook may refer to:
Kate Westbrook (musician) (born 1939), singer/songwriter
Kate Westbrook, pseudonym for Samantha Weinberg, author of The Moneypenny Diaries series